James Cooley (1926–2016) was an American mathematician.

James Cooley may also refer to:

 James Cooley (diplomat), U.S. Ambassador to Peru (1826–1828)
 James E. Cooley (1802–1882), New York City bookseller, auctioneer and politician
 Mesita (musical project), by James Cooley

See also
 James C. Field (James Cooley Field), American photographer
 James Cooley Fletcher (1823–1901), missionary